Olivier Stephane Boissy (born 22 January 1999) is a Senegalese professional footballer who plays as a striker for French club Saint-Pryvé on loan from Grenoble.

Club career
Boissy began his senior career in Ghana with the Accra Lions, before joining the reserve side of Hapoel Petah Tikva in 2017, before returning to Accra Lions again in 2018. He then moved to Salitas in Burkina Faso, scoring 21 goals in all competitions in his first season. On 17 July 2021, he transferred to Grenoble in the French Ligue 2. He made his professional debut with Grenoble in a 4–0 Ligue 2 loss to Paris FC on 24 July 2021.

On 1 February 2023, Boissy was loaned to Saint-Pryvé in Championnat National 2.

International career
Boissy is a youth international for Senegal, having represented the Senegal U20s once in 2017.

References

External links
 
 FDB Profile

1999 births
Footballers from Dakar
Living people
Senegalese footballers
Senegal youth international footballers
Association football forwards
Hapoel Petah Tikva F.C. players
Salitas FC players
Grenoble Foot 38 players
Saint-Pryvé Saint-Hilaire FC players
Burkinabé Premier League players
Ghana Premier League players
Ligue 2 players
Senegalese expatriate footballers
Senegalese expatriate sportspeople in Ghana
Expatriate footballers in Ghana
Senegalese expatriate sportspeople in Israel
Expatriate footballers in Israel
Senegalese expatriate sportspeople in Burkina Faso
Expatriate footballers in Burkina Faso
Senegalese expatriate sportspeople in France
Expatriate footballers in France